Zsolt Dávid Szabó (born 16 November 1995) is a Hungarian racing driver. Currently competing in the European Touring Car Cup. He previously competed in the TCR International Series and  SEAT León Eurocup. Former simulator champion and temporary driver of Formula Racing Miskolc formula student team.

Racing career
Szabó began his racing career in 2015 in SEAT León Eurocup. In May 2015, it was announced that Szabó would make his TCR International Series debut with Zengő Motorsport driving a SEAT León Cup Racer.

Szabó currently competing in European Touring Car Cup with Zengő Motorsport.

Racing record

Complete TCR International Series results
(key) (Races in bold indicate pole position) (Races in italics indicate fastest lap)

† Driver did not finish the race, but was classified as he completed over 90% of the race distance.

Complete World Touring Car Championship results
(key) (Races in bold indicate pole position) (Races in italics indicate fastest lap)

Complete World Touring Car Cup results
(key) (Races in bold indicate pole position) (Races in italics indicate fastest lap)

† Driver did not finish the race, but was classified as he completed over 90% of the race distance.

Complete TCR Europe Touring Car Series results
(key) (Races in bold indicate pole position) (Races in italics indicate fastest lap)

References

External links
 

1995 births
Living people
Hungarian racing drivers
SEAT León Eurocup drivers
TCR International Series drivers
Zengő Motorsport drivers
TCR Europe Touring Car Series drivers